Edward Alexander Partridge (5 November 1861 – 3 August 1931) was a Canadian teacher, farmer, agrarian radical, businessman and author. He was born in Ontario but moved to Saskatchewan where he taught and then became a farmer. He was active in the Territorial Grain Growers' Association (TGGA), founded in 1902, which addressed various problems with the Western Canada grain market. He founded the cooperative Grain Growers' Grain Company, the predecessor of the United Grain Growers, and the Grain Growers' Guide, a widely distributed weekly paper. His "Partridge Plan" was a broad and visionary proposal for addressing a wide range of farmers' issues, eliminating many abuses caused by the near-monopoly of grain elevator companies, and resulted in important reforms by the provincial governments. Patridge was named a National Historic Person in 2018.

Early career

Edward Alexander Partridge was born on 5 November 1861 near Crown Hill, Springwater then in Upper Canada.
He was the third son in a farming family. His parents were John Thomas Partridge and Martha Chappell.
There were fourteen children altogether in the family.
His father's parents had emigrated from New York State in 1819 and settled to the northeast of Barrie, Ontario. 
Partridge's mother died while he was an infant, and he lived with his grandparents for a period while he attended public school. He completed secondary school in Barrie and obtained a teacher's certificate. He taught for a period, then in December 1883 moved west with his brother to attempt farming in the District of Assiniboia.

They settled at the hamlet and railway station of Sintaluta, now in Saskatchewan but then in the North-West Territories.
Unable to afford the equipment and supplies he needed to operate a farm, Partridge returned to teaching.
He taught near Broadview, at Saltcoats and at Maple Green near Lemberg. He served in the Yorkton Militia from April to June 1885 during the North-West Rebellion.
In 1886, he married Mary Elizabeth Stephens in Balcarres, Saskatchewan, and they began a farm. 
They had three daughters and two sons.

Territorial Grain Growers' Association

Farmers formed the Territorial Grain Growers' Association (TGGA) in January 1902 to help them fight abuse by the grain dealers and railways.
The TGGA had succeeded in getting the Manitoba Grain Act amended to eliminate the main abuses by 1903.
With the passage of the amendments to the act it had achieved its primary objective, and lost some of its momentum.
Partridge began to push the TGGA members to demand tighter control of the grading system and inspection of elevators.
He also proposed a cooperative grain trading company owned by the farmers, a newspaper to help communication and greater involvement by farmers in political issues.

Grain Growers' Grain Company

The Sintaluta Local was concerned about the operation of the Winnipeg Grain Exchange. They persuaded the federal government to appoint a "watchdog" to make sure that the exchange was treating grain growers fairly, and they sent Partridge to Winnipeg in January–February 1905 to observe the exchange. He was treated poorly and became convinced that the exchange was not interested in the farmers, who needed their own grain company.
For his observations of the Grain Exchange he earned the nickname "That Man Partridge."
Patridge spoke at the SGGA convention in 1906, and attacked the grain handling system. He said that the elevator companies, millers and exporters rigged the grain prices so they were low during the fall harvest period, when farmers had to sell to obtain cash to pay their debts. They then made future contracts to the English buyers for delivery at far higher prices. Many of his audience were convinced by his argument.

On 27 January 1906 the Grain Growers' Grain Company (GGGC) was founded as a cooperative company to handle marketing of the grain, under Partridge's leadership.
The GGGC found itself engaged in a lengthy struggle with the existing grain companies over its seats on the Winnipeg Grain Exchange. It was expelled for paying patronage dividends to its member clients, then reinstated when the Manitoba Grain Growers' Association MGGA exerted pressure on the government of Rodmond Roblin.
The president of the MGGA, D.W. McCuaig, sued three of the exchange's members for combining to obstruct trade.

Partridge resigned as president of the GGGC at the 1907 convention, in part because the company's original cooperative structure had been modified to meet the requirements of the Grain Exchange, in part because he was not interested in running the company he had launched.
In 1908 Partridge lost a leg in an accident.

Grain Growers' Guide

Partridge felt that the press had given unfair treatment of the struggle to get the GGGC off the ground, and helped organize a farmers' publication.
The Grain Growers' Guide first appeared in 1908, edited by Partridge.
It was published by the Grain Growers' Grain Company through its subsidiary, Public Press Limited.
The Guide represented the interests of the MGGA and its sister organizations the Saskatchewan Grain Growers' Association (SGGA) and the United Farmers of Alberta (UFA).
Partridge thought the guide should be a militant paper, but was not supported in this view. He resigned after the first issue.

Partridge and Thomas Crerar of Manitoba attended the January 1909 convention where the Alberta Farmers' Association merged with the Canadian Society of Equity to form the United Farmers of Alberta. Before the merger the AFA's official organ was the Homestead, and the CSE published The Great West.
At his urging, these papers were absorbed by the Grain Growers' Guide.

Partridge Plan
Partridge continued to push for reform of the terminal market.
Under pressure, the government appointed the Millar Commission, led by SGGA secretary John Millar, to investigate the system.
The commission uncovered evidence of abuse by the grain dealers, but called for better regulation rather than government intervention. Partridge became the leader in a campaign to nationalize the elevators in the grain terminals.

Early in 1908 Partridge convinced the SGGA to endorse the principle that inland grain elevators should be owned by the province and terminal elevators by the Dominion of Canada. The Manitoba association passed a resolution supporting this proposal at their convention.
Soon after being launched, the Guide published the "Partridge Plan", in which he again proposed that grain elevators should be owned by the public, a position already accepted by the SGGA.
The premiers of the three Prairie provinces all took an interest in the plan, although Alberta and Saskatchewan preferred cooperative ownership to public ownership.

The plan covered a wide range of issues and was somewhat confused, but most SGGA members were enthusiastic about it.
The plan covered grain handling, the grain blockade, farm credit and market speculation. 
It identified and proposed remedies for practices by the elevator companies that included excessive dockage fees, light weights, refusing to bin special grain, replacing special binned grain with lower-quality grain and preventing farmers who had bought storage space in an elevator from dealing with non-company buyers. 
All these abuses derived from the effective monopoly of the large grain handlers, and could be eliminated by the government taking over the local elevators.

Partridge saw a conflict between the dual role of the elevator companies in storing and selling grain, which would be resolved if the elevators were strictly handling and storage facilities.
He also addressed the problems of the smaller farmers by proposing to combine wagon lots of equal quality grain into car lots. The farmer would be given an advance of up to half the total value, and a share of the price received when the car lot was sold. This anticipated the practice later adopted by the Wheat Pools and Wheat Board.
Partridge also proposed that the government build increased storage facilities so that farmers were not forced to sell as soon as the harvest was over, but could wait until prices rose in the spring or summer.

The grading system unduly emphasized color and weight of the kernel rather than the milled value, and encouraged mixing at the terminal elevators. Partridge proposed to replace this by a market where buyers could make their offer based on visual inspection of the grain being sold, eliminating the need for grading and letting sellers and buyers interact directly. 
The end result would also be to eliminate speculation in grain futures, with exporters buying stored grain only as needed based on samples.
The far-reaching reform proposals of the Partridge Plan thus addressed a wide range of farmer's concerns.

Other activities
In 1909 Partridge attended the annual meeting of the Dominion Grange, where the western grain grower's associations and the Farmers' Association of Ontario established the Canadian Council of Agriculture. He became interested in the idea of forming a major delegation of farmers to go to Ottawa and present their views to the government of Wilfrid Laurier, an event that became known as the "Siege of Ottawa". On 16 December 1910 from 850 to 1,000 delegates marched on the House of Commons. 
They were allowed to enter the house and present their briefs.
In 1912 Partridge left the GGGC during a dispute about a speculative purchase that one of the executives had made.
He felt that Thomas Alexander Crerar, the president of the GGGC, should be forced to leave.
Partridge tried to launch another grain company, but was not successful.

On 14 June 1914 Partridge's daughter Mary drowned in a swimming accident.
During World War I (1914–18) both of his sons enlisted, and later died.
In 1916 the GGGC directors started to remit money to Partridge.
In 1919 Partridge resumed public activity when he opposed the candidacy of William Richard Motherwell, who was running for the Liberals in a federal by-election in Assiniboia.
Motherwell was a past president of the TGGA and had opposed the Partridge Plan.
In the 1921 general election Partridge was almost nominated candidate for the Progressive Party in Qu'Appelle, Saskatchewan.
The Canadian Wheat Board was dissolved in 1920. 
Partridge campaigned for it to be reestablished. 
He did not succeed, but his campaign led to the creation in 1926 of the Saskatchewan section of the United Farmers of Canada.
Partridge was made honorary president of the organization.

Partridge came to believe that cooperation between farmers was not enough to solve the problems of wasteful competition and the accumulation of private wealth.
In 1925 he self-published a major book, A war on poverty: the one war that can end war, in which he violently attacked capitalism and supported the poor and underpaid.
The book has many references to the Supreme Being, and reflects his profound belief in the Social Gospel.
Partridge decried government-protected capitalists such as Gordon McGregor and Wallace Campbell who continued "to prey upon that part of the poor bedevilled Canadian public who can't escape to the United States".
He was deeply influenced by John Ruskin's social ideals, and by social Darwinism and Christian socialism.
His book calls for a co-operative commonwealth to be established in Western Canada.
It includes a section called "Coalsamao" in which he describes this future utopian state from an insider's viewpoint.

In 1925 Partridge's wife died from a heart attack. In 1926 Partridge moved to a room in a boarding house in Victoria, British Columbia to be near his youngest daughter. 
With no money apart from the small, monthly $75.00 UGG stipend, in poor health, and despairing of achieving further reforms, Partridge committed suicide on 3 August 1931.
He was 69 years old.

Publications
 Manifesto of the No-Party League of Western Canada (Winnipeg, 1913)
 National wheat marketing (n.p., [1921?]) 
 A war on poverty: the one war that can end war (Winnipeg, [1925]).

References

Sources

1861 births
1931 deaths
Canadian farmers
Persons of National Historic Significance (Canada)
20th-century Canadian businesspeople
1931 suicides
Suicides by gas
Suicides in British Columbia